Stoke by-election may refer to:

 1953 Stoke-on-Trent North by-election
 2017 Stoke-on-Trent Central by-election